William Spaulding may refer to:

 William H. Spaulding (1880–1966), American sports coach
 William J. Spaulding Sr. (1923–1997), American musician
 William R. Spaulding (1924–2021), American legislator
 Bill Spaulding (sportscaster) (born c. 1991), American sports announcer

See also
 William Spalding (disambiguation)
 Spaulding (disambiguation)